Wood Creek Lake is a  reservoir in Laurel County, Kentucky. Created by impounding Wood Creek in 1969, the lake is in the middle of Daniel Boone National Forest.

The dam and lake are owned by the Commonwealth of Kentucky.

References

External links 
 

Infrastructure completed in 1969
Reservoirs in Kentucky
Protected areas of Laurel County, Kentucky